Donald M. Davis (June 5, 1915 – October 23, 1976) is a former Democratic member of the Pennsylvania House of Representatives.

References

Democratic Party members of the Pennsylvania House of Representatives
1976 deaths
1915 births
20th-century American politicians